C . B. Suresh Babu is a politician from Karnataka, India. He is a leader of Janata Dal (Secular). He won thrice as MLA from Chikkanayakanahalli constituency.

Political life 
Babu entered politics by contesting by-elections in 1997 but lost to J. C. Madhu Swamy. In 1999 he became MLA of the Chikkanayakanahalli by defeating Madhu Swamy. Later he won two consecutive terms in 2008 and 2013. In 2018 Assembly elections he lost to J. C. Madhu Swamy. His father Late N Basavaiah was also a politician.

References 

Janata Dal (Secular) politicians
Living people
People from Tumkur district
Kannada people
1971 births